Wettlaufer is a surname. Notable people with the surname include:

Boyd Wettlaufer (1914–2009), Canadian archaeologist
Elizabeth Wettlaufer (born 1967), Canadian nurse and serial killer
Paul Wettlaufer (born 1978), Canadian field hockey player
Robin Wettlaufer, Canadian representative 
Ward Wettlaufer (born 1935), American golfer
Wayne Wettlaufer (born 1943), Canadian politician